Madame Sousatzka is a 1988 drama film directed by John Schlesinger, with a screenplay by Ruth Prawer Jhabvala. It is based upon the 1962 novel of the same name by Bernice Rubens.


Plot
Bengali immigrant Sushila Sen (Shabana Azmi) lives in London with her son Manek (Navin Chowdhry), who is musically gifted. She supports them both as a caterer of Indian food, while Manek studies the piano with Madame Sousatzka (Shirley MacLaine), who is a Russian-American immigrant. Madame Sousatzka, while highly talented, never succeeded as a pianist and thus lives through her students, particularly talented ones such as Manek. Manek is soon forced to choose between Madame Sousatzka and his mother, who both compete for his attention.

Cast
 Shirley MacLaine as Madame Sousatzka
 Navin Chowdhry as Manek
 Shabana Azmi as Sushila
 Peggy Ashcroft as Lady Emily
 Robert Rietty as Leo Milev
 Twiggy as Jenny
 Leigh Lawson as Ronnie
 Lee Montague as Vincent Pick

Accolades

Availability
The film was released in U.S. theaters on 14 October 1988. Some time after its theatrical run, the movie was released on videocassette by MCA Home Video in 1989. The movie was released on DVD in the U.S. by Universal Studios Home Entertainment under their Vault Series banner on 28 August 2014.

A region 2 DVD was released by Network in 2007 (catalogue nr. 7952723). The extras are a trailer and some production stills.

Notes

References

External links
 
 
 
 
 
 

1988 films
1988 drama films
British drama films
British Indian films
Films shot at EMI-Elstree Studios
Films directed by John Schlesinger
Films featuring a Best Drama Actress Golden Globe-winning performance
Films with screenplays by Ruth Prawer Jhabvala
Universal Pictures films
Films based on British novels
Films set in London
Alliance Atlantis films
Canadian drama films
1980s English-language films
1980s Canadian films
1980s British films